Hsawlaw Township is a township of Myitkyina District in the Kachin State of Burma. The principal town is Hsawlaw.

Towns and villages
 
  Ahkawhtawng
  Alawang
  Chawmaw
  Chawngbuk
  Chawngdam
  Chawngrang
  Chebuk
  Cheshen
  Chhachu
  Chhe-hkawng
  Chhiving
  Chili Htu
  Chunaw
  Chyangyu
  Gitta
  Hkabap
  Hkawnkaw
  Hkrangkao
  Hkringmaw
  Hpala
  Hpalawng
  Hpaungja
  Hpongsauk
  Hpyikrang
  Htahte Pam
  Htamtang
  Htaunghpau
  Htawlang
  Jampaw
  Jumja
  Kanaw
  Kanghai
  Kangtung
  Katze
  Khugaung
  Komo
  Kumaw
  Kyipaw
  Kyokha
  Laching
  Lahkam
  Lahpan
  Lajing
  Lakin
  Laktang
  Lakyaw
  Lalong
  Lamchyu
  Laohkam
  Latsawn
  Laukok
  Laukshwe
  Lawngte
  Lawngyaw
  Lawnjepa
  Longlam
  Mage
  Mahkung-adam
  Mangchibuk
  Mangkyi
  Mapili
  Marang Htung
  Mehke
  Mitlam
  Mitnaw
  Mi-yuk
  Myasa
  Myawchawng
  Nahkulaw
  Namyawngbuk
  Naya
  Ngataolungbu
  Pade
  Painaw
  Pakaw
  Pa-na
  Pasai
  Pashe
  Patam
  Pawawnbuk
  Pilao
  Rajawlaw
  Ratma
  Rawng-aw
  Rawngtsaw
  Rgangkum
  Rithtaung
  Ritjawng
  Rityawkyok
  Sachahaw
  Samma-cha
  Saungtaw
  Shangkyok
  Shipyam
  Tabanghka
  Talamtam
  Taungawn
  Tawngawkbuk
  Tsawlaw
  Tsumyaw
  Vawnpayit
  Vulao
  Wahao
  Wapyaw
  Wasukyang
  Wawgrup
  Wawhtung
  Wawmantam
  Wawmi
  Wawmum
  Welatam
  Wulang
  Wusiyachiku
  Wutsok
  Yawjawng
  Yawshaw
  Yelaung
  Yingying.

References

 
Townships of Kachin State